Matthew Wallner (born December 12, 1997) is an American professional baseball outfielder for the Minnesota Twins of Major League Baseball (MLB).

Born and raised in Forest Lake, Minnesota, Wallner played three years of college baseball at the University of Southern Mississippi. He finished his collegiate career as Southern Mississippi's all-time home run leader before the Minnesota Twins selected him with the 39th overall selection of the 2019 MLB draft. He played in their minor league system for four years before making his MLB debut in 2022.

Amateur career
Wallner graduated from Forest Lake Area High School in Forest Lake, Minnesota, where he played baseball. As a junior, he committed to play college baseball at the University of North Dakota. However, during his senior year, North Dakota dropped baseball for financial reasons, and he then signed with the University of Southern Mississippi. As a senior, he pitched to a 7-1 record with a 0.95 ERA along with batting .382 with ten home runs and was named Minnesota Mr. Baseball. Following his senior season, Wallner was selected by the Minnesota Twins in the 32nd round of the 2016 Major League Baseball draft. However, he did not sign, and instead chose to honor his commitment to the University of Southern Mississippi.

In 2017, as a freshman at USM, Wallner hit .336 with 19 home runs and 63 RBIs in 66 games. He also appeared in nine games out of the bullpen, compiling a 1.84 ERA. He was named Freshman of the Year by Conference USA (C-USA), Baseball America, and D1Baseball.com. He also garnered Freshman Hitter of the Year honors from the National Collegiate Baseball Writers Association. In addition, he was named to the C-USA All-Freshman Team as well as the C-USA Second Team, and was also named a Freshman All-American by multiple outlets including the Collegiate Baseball Newspaper and the National Collegiate Baseball Writers Association. As a sophomore in 2018, Wallner batted .351 with 16 home runs and 67 RBIs in 62 games while pitching to a 7.98 ERA in  innings. He was named to the C-USA First Team and once again was named an All-American by various publications. Following the season, he played for USA Baseball as a member of the Collegiate National Team. He also played in the Cape Cod Baseball League for the Falmouth Commodores. Prior to the 2019 season, Wallner was named a preseason All-American by Baseball America, Collegiate Baseball Newspaper, D1Baseball.com and Perfect Game. During the year, he hit his 54th career home run, becoming USM's all-time record holder. Wallner batted .323 with 23 home runs and sixty RBIs for the season, earning a spot on the C-USA First Team. He finished his collegiate career with a school record 58 home runs.

Professional career
The Minnesota Twins selected Wallner with the 39th overall pick in the 2019 Major League Baseball draft. He signed for $1.8 million, and was assigned to the Elizabethton Twins of the Rookie-level Appalachian League. He was promoted to the Cedar Rapids Kernels of the Class A Midwest League in August. Over 65 games between the two clubs, Wallner slashed .258/.357/.452 with eight home runs and 34 RBIs. He did not play a minor league game in 2020 due to the cancellation of the minor league season caused by the COVID-19 pandemic.

To begin the 2021 season, Wallner returned to Cedar Rapids, now members of the High-A Central. In late May, he was placed on the injured list with a right wrist sprain. It was later revealed that he broke a hamate bone and required surgery. He was activated on July 20. Over 68 games with Cedar Rapids, Wallner slashed .265/.350/.504 with 15 home runs and 47 RBIs. He was selected to play in the Arizona Fall League for the Scottsdale Scorpions after the season. Wallner was assigned to the Wichita Wind Surge of the Double-A Texas League to begin the 2022 season. He was selected to represent the Twins at the 2022 All-Star Futures Game. In mid-July, he was promoted to the St. Paul Saints of the Triple-A International League. Over 128 games played between Wichita and St. Paul, he slashed .277/.412/.541 in 458 at bats with 27 home runs, 95 RBIs, and 32 doubles, and was third in the minor leagues with 97 walks.

On September 17, the Twins selected Wallner's contract and promoted him to the major leagues. He made his MLB debut that night, hitting a solo home run off of Shane Bieber of the Cleveland Guardians for his first MLB hit.

References

External links

Southern Miss Golden Eagles bio

1997 births
Living people
People from Forest Lake, Minnesota
Baseball players from Minnesota
Forest Lake Area High School alumni
Major League Baseball outfielders
Minnesota Twins players
Southern Miss Golden Eagles baseball players
United States national baseball team players
Falmouth Commodores players
Elizabethton Twins players
Cedar Rapids Kernels players
Scottsdale Scorpions players
Wichita Wind Surge players
St. Paul Saints players